ČRo Jazz is a digital public radio station owned by Český rozhlas, and is dedicated mainly to Jazz music.

History
In August 2010, ČRo Jazz was created then as ČRo Euro Jazz and since then broadcasts digitally on DAB+, DVB-T, DVB-S and on the Internet.

Programming
ČRo Jazz is mainly broadcasting the following:
 about 40% of European jazz
 about 30% of American jazz 
 about 20% is of Czech jazz
 other, additional genres like: Funk, Bebop, Jazz-rock and Soul.

See also
 Czech Radio

External links
  About CRo Jazz at the official website
  CRo Jazz official website

Jazz radio stations
Radio stations in the Czech Republic
Mass media in Prague
Czech jazz
Radio stations established in 2010